4786 Tatianina, provisional designation , is a bright background asteroid and synchronous binary system from the inner regions of the asteroid belt, approximately  in diameter. It was discovered on 13 August 1985, by Soviet astronomer Nikolai Chernykh at the Crimean Astrophysical Observatory in Nauchnij, on the Crimean peninsula. It was named after Tatiana Somova, a friend of the discoverer. The E-/Xc-subtype has a short rotation period of 2.9 hours. Its sub-kilometer minor-planet moon was discovered on 20 March 2006 and announced the following month.

Orbit and classification 

Tatianina is a non-family asteroid from the main belt's background population. It orbits the Sun in the inner asteroid belt at a distance of 1.9–2.8 AU once every 3 years and 7 months (1,322 days; semi-major axis of 2.36 AU). Its orbit has an eccentricity of 0.19 and an inclination of 7° with respect to the ecliptic.

Physical characteristics 

In the SMASS classification, Tatianina is a Xc-subtype that transitions from the X-type to the carbonaceous C-type asteroids. It has also been characterized as a bright E-type by the Wide-field Infrared Survey Explorer (WISE).

Rotation period 

Several rotational lightcurves of Tatianina have been obtained from photometric observations since 2003. Analysis of the best-rated lightcurve from March 2003, during which a satellite was also discovered (see below), gave a rotation period of 2.9227 hours with a brightness amplitude of 0.19 and 0.20 magnitude.

Diameter and albedo 

According to the survey carried out by the NEOWISE mission of NASA's WISE telescope, Tatianina measures between 3.282 and 3.475 kilometers in diameter and its surface has an exceptionally high albedo of 0.4763 to 0.514. The Collaborative Asteroid Lightcurve Link adopts the revised WISE-data by Petr Pravec, that is an albedo of 0.4763 and rounded diameter of 3.48 kilometers based on an absolute magnitude of 13.718.

Satellite 

The discovery was announced on 11 April 2006. The mutual occultation events suggest the presence of a satellite with an estimated diameter of  meters or 19% the size of its primary.

Numbering and naming 

This minor planet was numbered on 28 April 1991. It was named by the discoverer after Tatiana Aleksandrovna Somova, a nursery-school teacher in Saint Petersburg, Russia. The official naming citation was published by the Minor Planet Center on 5 March 1996.

Notes

References

External links 
 CBET 472 – (4786) Tatianina, Central Bureau for Astronomical Telegrams, 11 April 2006
 Asteroids with Satellites, Robert Johnston, johnstonsarchive.net
 Asteroid Lightcurve Database (LCDB), query form (info )
 Dictionary of Minor Planet Names, Google books
 Discovery Circumstances: Numbered Minor Planets (1)-(5000) – Minor Planet Center
 
 

004786
Discoveries by Nikolai Chernykh
Named minor planets
004786
004786
19850813